Herbert Hnatek (21 July 1916 – May 1983) was an Austrian freestyle swimmer. He competed in the men's 4 × 200 metre freestyle relay at the 1936 Summer Olympics.

References

External links
 

1916 births
1983 deaths
Olympic swimmers of Austria
Swimmers at the 1936 Summer Olympics
Place of birth missing
Austrian male freestyle swimmers